The fourteenth series of the British semi-reality television programme The Only Way Is Essex was confirmed on 26 November 2014 when it had been announced that it had renewed for at least a further two series, the fourteenth and fifteenth. It is therefore the first series to be included in its current contract. The series launched on 22 February 2015 and was immediately followed by a one-off special "TOWIE: All Back to Essex" hosted by Mark Wright. It is the second series to feature on ITV's new channel ITVBe. It was the first series to include new cast members Dan Edgar, Jake Hall and Chloe Lewis, and the last to feature Charlie Sims, Dan Osborne, Jasmin Walia, Leah Wright and Ricky Rayment. Frankie Essex also made a brief return to the series having last appeared during the tenth series.

Cast

Episodes

{| class="wikitable plainrowheaders" style="width:100%; background:#fff;"
! style="background:#A4A4A4;"| Seriesno.
! style="background:#A4A4A4;"| Episodeno.
! style="background:#A4A4A4;"| Title
! style="background:#A4A4A4;"| Original air date
! style="background:#A4A4A4;"| Duration
! style="background:#A4A4A4;"| UK viewers

|}

Reception

Ratings

References

The Only Way Is Essex
2015 British television seasons